William Browne (c. 1590 – c. 1645) was an English pastoral poet, born at Tavistock, Devon, and educated at Exeter College, Oxford; subsequently he entered the Inner Temple.

His chief works were the long poem Britannia's Pastorals (1613), and a contribution to The Shepheard's Pipe (1614). Britannia's Pastorals was never finished: in his lifetime Books I & II were published successively in 1613 and 1616. The manuscript of Book III (unfinished) was not published until 1852. The poem is concerned with the loves and woes of Celia, Marina, etc.

To him is due the epitaph for the dowager Countess of Pembroke ("Sidney's sister, Pembroke's mother").

References

External links 
 
 
 
 Original poems by William Browne published with biographical comments and Browne's family tree by Samuel Egerton Brydges at the Lee Priory Press in 1815.

1590s births
1640s deaths
Writers from Tavistock
Alumni of Exeter College, Oxford
Members of the Inner Temple
English male poets